Mountala Zoubairou Garba Daniel (born 20 October 1986) is a Cameroonian-born Indonesian former footballer who plays as a centre-back.

Club career
Zoubairou was born in Cameroon.

PSIS Semarang
In 2006, Zoubairou joined PSIS Semarang, when he joined PSIS Semarang in the 2006 season. At that time, PSIS Semarang was brought to the Final before finally losing 1–0 by Persik Kediri at Manahan Stadium through Cristian Gonzáles's goal in 107 minutes of extra time. His duet with Maman Abdurrahman and Fofee Kamara at that time made the PSIS Semarang defense impenetrable. He is also familiar with supporters of PSIS Semarang, they call he with the nickname "Lek Slamet". In the 2007 season, he recorded 32 caps and received three yellow cards for PSIS Semarang in the 2007–08 season. But in the 2010–11 season, he canceled the PSIS Semarang because of administrative reasons, so the Semarang PSIS terminated his contract.

TIRA-Persikabo
In 2019, Zoubairou signed with TIRA-Persikabo for the 2019 Liga 1. He made his league debut in a 1–1 draw against Persib Bandung on 18 June 2019 as a substitute for Khurshed Beknazarov in the 71st minute at the Si Jalak Harupat Stadium, Soreang. Zoubairou made 14 league appearances and without scoring a goal for TIRA-Persikabo.

Persebaya Surabaya
He was signed for Persebaya Surabaya to play in Liga 1 in the 2020 season. This season was suspended on 27 March 2020 due to the COVID-19 pandemic. The season was abandoned and was declared void on 20 January 2021.

Perak FC
In 2021, Zoubairou signed a contract with Malaysia Super League club Perak. He made his league debut on 24 July 2021, in a 5–0 away loss against Terengganu as substitute. Zoubairou made 1 league appearance and without scoring a goal for Perak.

Career statistics

Club

Honours
Persebaya Surabaya
 East Java Governor Cup: 2020

References

External links
 
 Zoubairou Garba at Liga Indonesia

1985 births
Living people
Naturalised citizens of Indonesia
Indonesian footballers
Association football central defenders
PSIS Semarang players
Sriwijaya F.C. players
Persih Tembilahan players
Indonesian expatriate footballers
Indonesian people of Cameroonian descent